Evolver is the third album by English electronic dance group The Grid. It was released in 1994. "Swamp Thing" is the best-known song from the album. It became a dance club favourite and chart-hit in the UK, Europe and Australia. "Texas Cowboys" and "Rollercoaster" were also released as singles. Evolver reached number 14 on the UK Albums Chart.

Track listing
All tracks written by Grid members Richard Norris and Dave Ball.
"Wake Up"  – 7:53
"Rollercoaster"  – 6:34
"Swamp Thing"  – 6:41
"Throb"  – 5:04
"Rise"  – 6:07
"Shapes of Sleep"  – 6:44
"Higher Peaks"  – 6:11
"Texas Cowboys"  – 5:51
"Spin Cycle"  – 5:31
"Golden Dawn"  – 9:38

Additional information
Susannah Melvoin provides vocals on the track "Rollercoaster".
Although the track "Golden Dawn" is listed as being 9:38 long on the cover it is actually only approximately 7:21 in length.  After the music finishes there is one minute of silence followed by a hidden track at 8:21.  This consists of a jocular message left on a telephone answering machine.

Charts

References

The Grid albums
1994 albums